Colotis celimene, the lilac tip or magenta tip, is a butterfly of the family Pieridae. The species was first described by Hippolyte Lucas in 1852.  It is found in the Afrotropical realm.

The wingspan is 37–40 mm. The adults fly year round, peaking from March to May.

The larvae feed on Boscia albitrunca and Capparis species.

Subspecies
The following subspecies are recognised:
 C. c. celimene (H. Lucas, 1852) (Ethiopia, Uganda, Kenya, Tanzania, Malawi)
 C. c. amina (Hewitson, 1866) (Zambia, Zimbabwe, Mozambique, Botswana (east), Eswatini, South Africa)
 C. c. angusi Rothschild, 1921 (Niger, central and western Sudan)
 C. c. pholoe (Wallengren, 1860) (Angola, western Botswana, Namibia)
 C. c. praeclarus (Butler, 1886) (Ethiopia, Somalia)
 C. c. sudanicus (Aurivillius, 1905) (eastern Senegal, Burkina Faso, northern Ghana, northern Nigeria, Niger to the Democratic Republic of the Congo, southern Sudan)

References

Butterflies described in 1852
celimene